Huang Chien-lung (born 4 November 1970) is a Taiwanese judoka. He competed in the men's lightweight event at the 1996 Summer Olympics. He also competed in the wrestling at the 1988 Summer Olympics.

References

External links
 

1970 births
Living people
Taiwanese male judoka
Taiwanese male sport wrestlers
Olympic judoka of Taiwan
Olympic wrestlers of Taiwan
Judoka at the 1996 Summer Olympics
Wrestlers at the 1988 Summer Olympics
Place of birth missing (living people)
Judoka at the 1990 Asian Games
Asian Games medalists in judo
Asian Games bronze medalists for Chinese Taipei
Medalists at the 1990 Asian Games
20th-century Taiwanese people